is a park which straddles Musashino and Mitaka in western Tokyo, Japan.

The land was given to Tokyo in 1913. On May 1, 1917, it opened under the name Inokashira Onshi Kōen (井の頭恩賜公園), which can be translated as, "Inokashira Imperial Grant Park". Thus the park was considered a gift from the Emperor to the general public.

Data
 Date opened: May 1, 1917
 Area: 383,773 m2
 Address: Gotenyama 1-chōme, Kichijōji Minami-chō 1-chōme, Musashino city, Inokashira 3~5-chōme, Shimorenjaku 1-chōme, Mure 4-chome, Mitaka city, Tokyo
 Nearest stations: 5 min walk from Kichijōji (JR Chūō line), 1 min walk from Inokashira-kōen Station (Keiō Inokashira Line)
 Number of trees: Tall trees: 11,060 / shrubs: 12,800 / lawn: 10,000 m2
 Variety of plants: Cherry trees, cypresses, red pines, azaleas

Geography
Inokashira Park encompasses Inokashira pond in its center. Inokashira Pond is a long, narrow pond, stretching from northwest to southeast, and split into two branches at the northwest end. From the southeast end, the Kanda River flows outward. A section of the stream is also within the bounds of the park. On the west side of the park is a thicket, in Gotenyama, and a small zoo. On the other side of Kichijoji Ave. is the Tokyo Metropolitan Government Bureau of Construction. On the southern side of the thicket, the Tamagawa Aqueduct flows toward the southeast, and further south is the “western park” area. Beside the downstream section of the Tamagawa Aqueduct is there is an “Eastern Garden,” which includes a small open area.

With regard to city boundaries, the Inokashira Pond section of the Kanda River in the park, Inokashira-kōen Station, and the West and East gardens are in Mitaka. The area of the park beginning just past the northern shore of Inokashira Pond is in Musashino. Near the park, less than 500 meters from Inokashira Pond is Kichijōji station, on the JR Chuo Line. The path from the station toward the pond is lined with shops aimed at young people. In the southeast of the park is Inokashira-kōen Station, on the Keio Inokashira Line, which runs parallel to the Kanda River. The distance from the station to the pond is very short, and there are small paths and open spaces between them which visitors can wander through. It is said that, if you ride the boats on Inokashira Park's pond with a girlfriend, you will surely break up soon.

Nature and the seasons

Spring in Inokashira Park is the season of the blooming cherry trees that line the pond. Looking from the Nanai Bridge, which crosses the pond near the center, the branches of the cherry trees extending from the shore bloom so densely as to all but cover the surface of the pond. The pale color of the blossoms contrasts with the sky and water's surface. During the blooming period of cherry blossoms the park receives many visitors. In addition, on the west side of the park there are many flowers to be seen in the flowering plum grove before the blooming period of the cherry trees. On the north side of the plum grove, on the edge of the pond, there is a spring, but its flow is nowadays weak.

In summer one can enjoy the green of the trees that cover Gotenyama. In autumn the leaves of the many kinds of trees in the park change color, and the fallen leaves bury the walking paths. Winter in Inokashira Park is also lively. Many migrating birds come, and Inokashira Pond becomes their wintering place. Wild snakes can also be seen within the park.

Attractions

The park contains a small temple dedicated to Benzaiten. The park has a petting zoo and a small aquarium, and is a place where vendors, musicians, artists and street performers gather. The park is bustling with crowds who arrive to take in the lively environment on weekends and holidays, especially during the cherry blossom season when the entire park is overrun with visitors for hanami.

On the southwest end of Inokashira Park is the Ghibli Museum, a popular destination dedicated to the animated productions of Studio Ghibli.

Main Events
As of 2010, the main annual events held at Inokashira Park are as follows.

Kichijoji Music Festival – Park Concert (beginning in April every year). A Golden Week event. Acts such as brass bands and chorus groups perform.
Kichijouji Anime Wonderland （held annually in October during consecutive holidays.）
. On an outdoor stage, the singers of anime songs and voice actors perform concerts and talk shows.
. A screen is set up on the outdoor stage, and anime is shown. Shown from evening until night of the Saturday of the festival.
. Sales booths. Various anime goods are sold beside the outdoor stage.

Gallery

See also

 Inokashira Park dismemberment incident

External links

Photographs of the park by Kensuke Kazama. Accessed 9 September 2007.
Photographs of Inokashira Park during Cherry Blossoms by Danilo Dungo.

Parks and gardens in Tokyo
Hanami spots of Japan
Musashino, Tokyo
Mitaka, Tokyo
1917 establishments in Japan